William Simmian "Willis" Kienholz (October 10, 1875 – September 20, 1958) was an American football player and coach. He served one-year stints as the head coach at six different colleges: Lombard College in Galesburg, Illinois (1903), North Carolina College of Agriculture and Mechanic Arts—now North Carolina State University (1904), the University of Colorado at Boulder (1905), University of North Carolina at Chapel Hill (1906), Auburn University (1907), and Washington State University (1909). Kienholz played football at the University of Minnesota in 1898 and 1899.

Coaching career

In 1902, Kienholz was an assistant football coach as his alma mater, Minnesota, working under head coach Henry L. Williams. The next year he was the head football coach at Lombard College in Galesburg, Illinois, leading his team to a championship of Illinois colleges.

In 1904, Kienholz coached at North Carolina A&M, and compiled a 3–1–2 record. In 1905, he coached at Colorado, and compiled an 8–1 record. In 1907, he coached at Auburn, and compiled a 6–2–1 record. In 1909, he coached at Washington State, and compiled a 4–1 record.

Later life and death
Kienholz later served as the director of vocational training for the public schools of Los Angeles, California. He died on September 20, 1958, in Seattle, Washington.

Head coaching record

References

External links

 

1875 births
1958 deaths
19th-century players of American football
American football halfbacks
American football quarterbacks
Auburn Tigers football coaches
Colorado Buffaloes football coaches
Lombard Olive football coaches
Minnesota Golden Gophers football coaches
Minnesota Golden Gophers football players
NC State Wolfpack football coaches
North Carolina Tar Heels football coaches
Washington State Cougars football coaches
People from Dodge County, Minnesota
Coaches of American football from Minnesota